Bridge No. 4, near La Crosse, Wisconsin, United States, was built in 1902. It is a bowstring truss bridge built by the Clinton Bridge Company. It was listed on the National Register of Historic Places in 1980 and documented by the Historic American Engineering Record in 1987.

The bridge is one of seven built during 1891-92 by the Clinton Bridge Company, of Clinton, Iowa, to bring a La Crosse County road through backwaters of the Black River and then cross the Black River itself, connecting the city of La Crosse with rural Trempeleau County. All seven were bowstring truss bridges, but one was replaced by a kingpost truss bridge nine years after being damaged in 1911. The kingpost truss and all but the main bridge spanning the Black River itself survived in 1979.

The Black River had previously been crossed by a ferry started by Alex McGilvray in 1861.

It has a concrete deck. Its steel was from the Jones and Laughlin Steel Company. The tension members of the bridge "are a combination of round and square eye-bars with the eyes made by looping over and welding the end of the bar."

See also
List of bridges documented by the Historic American Engineering Record in Wisconsin

References

External links

, includes information about Bridge No. 4

Bridges completed in 1902
Road bridges on the National Register of Historic Places in Wisconsin
Buildings and structures in La Crosse County, Wisconsin
Historic American Engineering Record in Wisconsin
National Register of Historic Places in La Crosse County, Wisconsin
Steel bridges in the United States
Bowstring truss bridges in the United States